Vladimir Vladimirovich Efimov  (born on June 26, 1981) is a Russian statesman and manager, Deputy Mayor of Moscow for Economic Policy and Property and Land Relations.

Biography

Vladimir Efimov was born in Kursk on June 26, 1981.

Education

In 2003, he graduated with honors from Moscow State Institute of International Relations, speciality - “economics, finance and credit”.

Economic activity

Vladimir Efimov worked as an expert in the research fund called Support for development of civil society institutions. Then he worked as an economist at the Center for Social and Labor Rights.

In 2004 he joined the Federal Antimonopoly Service (the Office for Control and Supervision of Real Estate, Local Monopolies and Housing and Utilities services).

In 2007 he was appointed the head of this department.

In 2009 Efimov was appointed the head of the Office of the Federal Antimonopoly Service in Moscow.

In 2011 he was invited to the Government of Moscow for the ministerial post - the head of the Department of Land Resources.

In 2013 there were structural changes in the Government of Moscow: the Department of Land Resources and the Property Department were merged, and Vladimir Efimov headed a new department - the Moscow Property Department. In 2014 the Department of Housing Policy entered the Moscow Property Department. The functions of the Moscow City Property Department were extended.

Since February 2017 he has been Minister of the Government of Moscow, Head of the Department of Economic Policy and Development of Moscow.

Minister of the Government of Moscow

On December 6, 2011 Moscow Mayor Sergei Sobyanin Sergei Sobyanin announced the appointment of Vladimir Yefimov to the ministerial post of the Moscow Government—the head of the Moscow Department of Land Resources. The head of the Federal Antimonopoly Service of Russia Igor Artemyev expressed himself about Vladimir Efimov: "We recommended the candidacy of Vladimir Efimov for this post and support his appointment. Vladimir Yefimov oversaw for a long time the control and supervision of real estate, local monopolies and housing and communal services, acquired the necessary knowledge and experience in this area. These facts allow us to express confidence that his work will positively affect the rational use of the city land potential".

On February 20, 2013 Moscow Mayor Sergei Sobyanin signed an edict providing merger of the Department of Land Resources and the Property Department. He also appointed Vladimir Efimov as head of the new Moscow Property Department.

The department headed by Efimov was the first body to develop regulations for public services in the sphere of property and land relations. It is also the first department which introduced a quality management system in accordance with ISO 9001: 2008.

During organization of the new Moscow Property Department the number of employees was reduced by 30%, which significantly reduced the costs for officials' salaries.

Land reform

At a time when Vladimir Efimov was a head of the Moscow Property Department, a number of important events were held:
 projects for surveying residential areas throughout the city were developed;
 the practice of forming land on the "sole" of the building was abolished;
 a mechanism to change the type of permitted use for construction for owners of land plots has been created,

The implementation of these measures allowed to begin the design of land plots for multi-apartment buildings by tenants in 2015.

In June 2014, on the initiative of Yefimov, amendments were adopted to the Land Law of the Russian Federation granting to the owners of buildings rights to increase the area of land plots, which provided an opportunity for the development of the territories and increasing the incomes of the city budget.

There has been created a transparent system of calculating fees for changing the purpose of using a land plot for construction, depending on the building density and cadastral value. Investors got opportunity to calculate independently the amount of payment on the site of the Moscow Property Department.

Experts noted the transparency of this formula for potential investors:

"The head of the analytical center of Real Estate Company Est-a-Tet Investment Denis Bobkov expressed about the introduced calculation system the following opinion: «The procedure has become more understandable, it will be easier to master new territories. Of course, the main buyers of large areas will be developers who acquire land for building large-scale facilities."

In Moscow historic buildings are being saved with the help of private funds: the money is spent on repair and restoration. Over the past five years, the city has been operating a rental program "one ruble per square meter" which is beneficial to entrepreneurs, residents and the city, said the Minister of The government of Moscow Vladimir Efimov.

The program “a ruble per square meter” acts in Moscow for last five years. The auction winners rents historical buildings for 50 years term for very little money. Due to project there were saved more than 20 buildings. The sums of private investments for five years is 2,3 billions of rubles, says the minister of The government of Moscow Vladimir Efimov.

Interaction with the business community

Efimov launched the mechanism of the redemption of leased from town premises by small businesses. There were signed more than 5,000 contracts-sale of properties with small businesses from 2010 to 2016. That worth more than 100 billion rubles.

There were implemented transparent and clear system of land submission for leading business at auctions. This allowed to implement the rights to conclude lease agreements for 6 years for about 200 land areas that in total 70 hectares for the sum more than 6 billion rubles.

Auction for the sale of rights to public property are centralized on a single electronic platform of the Department for competition policy of Moscow. From 2010 to 2016, the government sold more than 3,000 real estates in the amount of about 54 billion rubles.

Moscow and the pharmaceutical concern BIOCAD concluded an offset bargain - the first in Russia. Minimum ten nearest years the capital will assuredly purchase actual medications from the vendor.

Moscow enterprises that create workplaces have the benefits from city and pay less taxes also. This influence the megapolis economy in a positive way. In 2017 year the accumulated investments amounted to more than 80 billion rubles, said the minister of The government of Moscow Vladimir Efimov.

Economic activity

Under the leadership of Vladimir Efimov Moscow budget income increased by three times from the use of land resources. The share of rental property revenues increased from 33% to 57% in the total revenues from use of city assets.

There were organized withdrawal of the town from participation in Charter capitals of most companies operating in competitive markets. There were liquidated or privatized more than 70% of unprofitable and non-core organizations with participation of the city. The number of economic societies with the share of Moscow decreased by more than three times.

In 2013, the Department of urban property of Moscow under the leadership of Vladimir Yefimov made the biggest deal, worth about 100 billion rubles at privatization of the equity stake of OJSC MUEC (Moscow United energy company) (100%) and used assets. In this transaction the city had earned the largest sum in the framework of the privatization of city assets.

Moscow economy is developing. The speed of gross regional product rise will reach 2,3% to 2020 year. According to the minister of The government of Moscow Vladimir Efimov the growth of GRP is showing the quality of industry, export, as well as the development of information technology, research and engineering.

Head of Department of economic policy and development

On the 7th of February the mayor of Moscow Sergey Sobyanin appointed Vladimir Efimov to the post of head of Department of economic policy and development of Moscow government.

Standing on a post of the head of Department Yefimov denominated the following priority lines: effective tax administration, monitoring of tariff policy and increase of budgetary expenses efficiency. He also noted that the implementation of the investment strategy denoted by 2025 and improving migration legislation will be continued fully.

By Vladimir Efimovs' initiative there were granted tax benefits for residents and management companies of special economic zones, established on the territory of Moscow. For residents the period of exemption from payment of vehicle tax increased from 5 to 10 years. For the same period management companies are exempt from taxes. Also the extension period of exemption from payment for land tax from 5 to 10 years is provided for residents. Also the specialities of applying lower rates of Moscow budget tax on organisation profits have changed. This way for more than ten years, from 2018 to 2028, the rate of 0% will be operating. In the next five years, from 2028 to 2033, it will be 5%. And in 2033 and then further the wate size will be equal to 12.5%. As for management companies from the 1st of January, 2017 the tax rate on profits will be set at the rate of 12.5%, and from the 1st of January, 2021 - 13.5 percent. Because of activities of the Department of economic policy and development in Moscow the conditions for raising capital are settled, the investment climate is improving. Two categories of regional investment projects participants are getting benefits: the organisations that are included to the register on the basis of special requirements, and investors who have signed a special investment contract (SPIC) at the Federal level. For the first category the tax on organisation profits that are to be paid to the Moscow budget is decreased by 10%. The validity period of benefits is 10 years (until 2028); for the second category a zero rate is set until 2025.

Vladimir Efimov commented on the adoption of these initiatives: "Investment attracting has been and remains a priority of the Government of Moscow," said the Minister. "We conduct a purposeful work, we use all the tools, including those that are offered by the Federal Government. The adopted law increases the competitiveness of Moscow in attracting companies that invest in the modernization or development of industrial products production."

Moscow sells for migrants labour patents actively. As the result of the 2017 year the city budget received 15,7 billion rubles. This was stated by the Moscow Government Minister Vladimir Yefimov. 

Moscow is one of the most appealing for investments cities at international level, considers the minister of the government of Moscow Vladimir Efimov. It is the largest labour market in the country and the businessmen are supported by the state.

The minister of the government of Moscow Vladimir Efimov stated that Moscow is the center of testing and integration of new technologies in Russia. The export in the field of scientific research and technology has grown. The last year showed the increase for 49.8% in just two months.

References

Russian politicians
1981 births
Living people